Ayaz Mahmood  (born May 24, 1965) is a field hockey player for Pakistan. He was born in Karachi, Pakistan. He is one of the know personalities, who played center half for Pakistan and won a gold medal in 1984 summer olympics, Los Angeles.

Ayaz Mahmood started his career in 1980 and represented Pakistan until 1988. During his career the Pakistan team won many events with a Gold, Silver & Bronze medals. After his retirement from his hockey career he has been affiliated with P.H.F(Pakistan hockey federation) as a coach for Pakistan Junior's and Senior team. Currently he is one of the selectors for Pakistan hockey team.

Ayaz Mahmood's father also represented Pakistan as a hockey player who played two olympics 1948 London, United Kingdom & 1952 Helsinki, Finland.

References

External links

1964 births
Living people
Pakistani male field hockey players
Olympic field hockey players of Pakistan
Field hockey players at the 1984 Summer Olympics
Olympic gold medalists for Pakistan
Olympic medalists in field hockey
Field hockey players from Karachi
Medalists at the 1984 Summer Olympics
Field hockey players at the 1986 Asian Games
Asian Games medalists in field hockey
Asian Games silver medalists for Pakistan
Medalists at the 1986 Asian Games